Santiago Capurro (born 8 April 1975) is an Argentine former field hockey player who competed in the 1996 Summer Olympics and in the 2000 Summer Olympics.

He was Carlos Retegui's assistant during his two periods as coach of the Argentina women's national field hockey team. He was chosen to replace him after the 2014 Women's Hockey World Cup. After little over a year, he was replaced by Gabriel Minadeo.

References

External links
 

1971 births
Living people
Argentine male field hockey players
Argentine field hockey coaches
Olympic field hockey players of Argentina
Argentine people of Italian descent
Field hockey players at the 1996 Summer Olympics
Field hockey players at the 2000 Summer Olympics
2002 Men's Hockey World Cup players
21st-century Argentine people